"Wonderland" is a single-only release by Scottish band Big Country, released in the UK on 9 January 1984 between their first and second albums. It became a top ten hit for them in the UK, peaking at number 8, giving the band their third top ten entry. The song was included on all the band's subsequent greatest hits collections, although it was never released on any of the band's studio albums. Also released as a 4-song EP in the US in 1984 on Mercury (Mercury 818835-1 M-1) with the A-side consisting of "Wonderland" and "All Fall Together" and the B-side with "Angle Park" and "The Crossing".

The music video for the song features the band playing the song in a wooded area.

Chart positions

References

1984 songs
1984 singles
Big Country songs
Song recordings produced by Steve Lillywhite
Songs written by Stuart Adamson
Songs written by Mark Brzezicki
Songs written by Tony Butler (musician)
Songs written by Bruce Watson (guitarist)
Mercury Records singles